Dominica: Charting a Future for Paradise is a 2011 documentary short film about the history of the Commonwealth of Dominica and the challenges it faces as a young independent nation. The film has screened at the Africa World Documentary Film Festival in St. Louis and in Barbados, the Montreal Black Film Festival, and it received the award for Best Documentary Short at the 2012 Third World Independent Film Festival.

Production
Filming occurred during October and November 2008, with production finishing in December 2011.

References

External links

Bardouille Productions

2011 films
Films set in Dominica
Films shot in Dominica